Spyridium cordatum is a species of flowering plant in the family Rhamnaceae and is endemic to the south-west of Western Australia.

The species was first formally described in 1858 by Nikolai Turczaninow, who gave it the name Cryptandra cordata in the Bulletin de la Société Impériale des Naturalistes de Moscou. In 1863, George Bentham changed the name to Spyridium cordatum in Flora Australiensis. The specific epithet (cordatum) means "heart-shaped", referring to the leaves. 
Spyridium cordatum mainly grows in gravelly, stony or rocky places in mallee and occurs from near Lake King to the Cape Arid National Park in the Esperance Plains and Mallee bioregions of south-western Western Australia. It is listed as "not threatened" by the Government of Western Australia Department of Biodiversity, Conservation and Attractions.

References

cordatum
Rosales of Australia
Flora of Western Australia
Taxa named by Nikolai Turczaninow
Plants described in 1858